Phillips v Eyre (1870) LR 6 QB 1 is an English decision on the conflict of laws in tort. The Court developed a two limbed test for determining whether a tort occurring outside of the court's jurisdiction can be actionable.  In time this came to be referred to as the "dual-actionability test" (or "double actionability test").

Facts
Edward John Eyre had been the governor of Jamaica during the Morant Bay rebellion. As governor he ordered a forceful response, which led to the deaths of numerous Jamaicans, and the arrest and summary execution of various political figures whom Eyre believed to be instigators of the uprising.  At the end of his term as governor, the colonial assembly had passed an Act of Indemnity covering all acts done in good faith to suppress the rebellion after the proclamation of martial law.

When he returned to England, several Jamaicans sued him for trespass to the person and false imprisonment in the Courts of England.

Peter Handford described the background to the case as follows:

The particular activist concerned was one George William Gordon, a mixed-race member of the local assembly.  Bad blood existed between Eyre and Gordon before the rebellion.  Having had Gordon and William Bogle (the brother of Paul Bogle, the main leader in the revolt) arrested on suspicion of treason, both were tried under martial law and then summarily executed within two days.  The entire suppression of the rebellion was undoubtedly extremely violent.  Some 439 people were killed by British forces, and a further 600 odd were flogged and about 1000 houses burned down.  Further there is evidence that some of the British officers treated the task as "hunting sport".

Although most contemporary accounts seem to blame specific British military officers (under the command of General Luke O'Connor) rather than Eyre, sensational reporting of both the rebellion and its bloody suppression made Eyre a controversial figure in Britain.  This came to be known as the "Jamaica Question", which essentially boiled down to the question of whether Eyre to be regarded as a hero who had fulfilled his duties as governor in suppressing the rebellion and saving the white population of Jamaica from massacre, or a murderer who should be prosecuted and held accountable for his crimes.  Attempt to bring criminal proceedings against Eyre failed, and so the various activists tried again bringing a civil suit.  The activists referred to themselves as the "Jamaica Committee" and included liberal thinkers like John Bright, Charles Buxton, Peter Alfred Taylor, John Stuart Mill, Thomas Hughes, Charles Darwin, Thomas Huxley and Goldwin Smith.

Judgment
Exceptionally the case was heard by a bench of six judges.  Willes J gave the decision of the court.

Curiously much of the case was dedicated not to the double actionability rule for which it would later be cited, but to argument upon whether (i) a law which was retrospective in nature was repugnant to natural justice, and (ii) whether the law was defective as a matter of procedure as the Governor had passed a statute into law in respect of which he had a direct conflict of interest.  The findings on double actionability are relegated to a few short passages near the end.

The Court held that Eyre could not be sued for his conduct in Jamaica. In order to bring an action the claimant must satisfy two requirements. First, the alleged conduct must "be of such a character that it would have been actionable if it had been committed" in the local jurisdiction. Second, "the act must not have been justifiable by the law of the place where it was done." That is, it must be non-justifiable at the lex loci actus.

Due to the Act that Eyre passed just before leaving, the act was found to be justifiable by the law of Jamaica and thus could not be actionable in England.

Significance
One of the especially contentious parts of Eyre's conduct was the fact that the law he enacted was meant to cover all acts he had already done, making de facto powers de jure.  There is a presumption in English law against retrospective effect and Willes J, who gave the judgment, noted that "The court will not ascribe retrospective force to new laws affecting rights unless by express words or necessary implication that such was the intention of the legislature".  It was held in that case that Eyre's intention was clear.

The double actionability rule has now largely been abrogated in English law pursuant to the Private International Law (Miscellaneous Provisions) Act 1995, although it still applies to defamation claims.  But the case remains good law in a number of other common law jurisdictions.

See also
Boys v Chaplin [1971] AC 356
 Colin Blackburn, Baron Blackburn

Notes

1870 in case law
1870 in British law
English conflict of laws case law
English tort case law
Court of King's Bench (England) cases